Malith de Silva (born 12 April 1995) is a Sri Lankan cricketer. He made his first-class debut for Bloomfield Cricket and Athletic Club in the 2016–17 Premier League Tournament on 3 December 2016. He made his List A debut for Anuradhaura District in the 2016–17 Districts One Day Tournament on 15 March 2017. He made his Twenty20 debut on 6 January 2016, for Galle Cricket Club in the AIA Premier T20 Tournament.

References

External links
 

1995 births
Living people
Sri Lankan cricketers
Anuradhaura District cricketers
Bloomfield Cricket and Athletic Club cricketers
Cricketers from Galle